The Chelsea Hotel, Toronto is the largest hotel in Canada, located at 33 Gerrard Street West in Toronto, Ontario. The 26 floor,  hotel contains 1,590 guest rooms and suites, with 5 basements and 18 elevators.

History
The structure originally received funding from the Canada Mortgage and Housing Corporation to be constructed as a student housing cooperative and then was planned as a residential condominium building by Toronto architectural firm Crang and Boake. However, it eventually opened as a hotel on October 15, 1975, operated by Delta Hotels as Delta's Chelsea Inn. The hotel was purchased in 1996 by Great Eagle Holdings of Hong Kong.  

On December 19, 2012, Great Eagle Holdings announced it would end its management agreement with Delta Hotels on July 1, 2013, and place the property, by then known as Delta Chelsea Toronto, under the control of its subsidiary, Langham Hospitality Group in their Eaton Hotels division, which has since been rebranded as Eaton Workshop Hotels. It was reported that Great Eagle Holdings would not commit to renovations that Delta sought in order to upgrade the hotel. Ken Greene, president and CEO of Delta Hotels, stated that "It was a tough decision to part ways", adding, "This is symbolic of the repositioning that Delta is going through. It definitely shows that we are very serious about becoming the leading four-star brand." Delta had announced that it was building a new flagship hotel (the Delta Toronto Hotel) in Toronto's South Core district as part of a development led by its parent company at the time, the British Columbia Investment Management Corporation.

The hotel changed its name to the Eaton Chelsea on July 1, 2013. Although the Eaton Chelsea had a marketing partnership with nearby Toronto Eaton Centre, it had no corporate relationship to the mall, nor did the Eaton Hotels hotel chain have any historical connection to the mall's namesake, Timothy Eaton, or the defunct Eaton's department store chain that he founded.

In early 2015, the hotel rebranded again as the Chelsea Hotel, while remaining under the control of the Langham Hospitality Group and retaining most other aspects of the Eaton Hotels branding.

Location
The Chelsea Hotel is located within the Downtown Yonge area of downtown Toronto. It is situated between the College and Dundas TTC subway stations on the Yonge-University-Spadina Line.

Amenities
In addition to the 1,590 guest rooms and suites, the Chelsea Hotel also has several restaurants, meeting areas, conference rooms, an underground parking garage, a KidZone (as the hotel bills itself as a family-friendly destination), and 2 indoor swimming pools, one of which has Toronto's only downtown, indoor water slide. A portion of the slide is visible over the Walton Street entrance.

References

External links 

 

Hotels in Toronto
Hotel buildings completed in 1975
Hotels established in 1975
1975 establishments in Ontario